RK Baldone is a Latvian rugby club based in Baldone.

External links
RK Baldone

Latvian rugby union teams
Ķekava Municipality
Organizations with year of establishment missing